Southport Football Club is an English association football club based in Southport, Merseyside who currently play in the Conference National. This list details the club's achievements in senior league and cup competitions, and the top scorers for each season where known.

Southport Central were formed in 1881 and played their first association football match on 12 November of that year against Bootle. Originally a rugby union side the club switched codes after suffering a succession of heavy defeats. The club became founder members of The Central League in 1911. In 1918, the club was renamed as Southport Vulcan  – having been bought by the Vulcan Motor Company – becoming the first club to take a sponsor's name. In 1919, the sponsorship from Vulcan ended thus meaning a final name change, this time to Southport. In 1921, all first teams playing in the Central League became founder members of the newly formed Football League Third Division North including Southport, with the Central League becoming a league for Football League reserve teams.

Statistics

Seasons in Football Conference/Conference National: 17
Seasons in Conference North: 4
Seasons in Football League Third Division: 4
Seasons in Football League Third Division North: 30
Seasons in Football League Fourth Division: 16
Seasons in Lancashire League 14
Seasons in Lancashire Combination Division One: 7
Seasons in Lancashire Combination Division Two: 1
Seasons in Northern Premier League: 16
Seasons in The Central League: 6
Seasons in Football League Lancashire Section, Northern Group Principal Competition: 1
Seasons in Football League Lancashire Section, Northern Group Principal Competition Group A: 3

Key

Division shown in bold when it changes due to promotion, relegation or league reorganisation. Top scorer shown in bold when he set or equalled a club record.

Key to league record:
P – Played
W – Games won
D – Games drawn
L – Games lost
F – Goals for
A – Goals against
Pts – Points
Pos – Final position

Key to colours and symbols:

Conf = Football Conference
Conf Nat = Conference National
Conf Nor = Conference North
Div 3 = Football League Third Division
Div 3 N = Football League Third Division North
Div 4 = Football League Fourth Division
Lancs = Lancashire League
Lancs C1 = Lancashire Combination Division One
Lancs C2 = Lancashire Combination Division Two
NPL = Northern Premier League
TCL = The Central League
FLLS = Football League Lancashire Section, Northern Group Principal Competition
FLLSA = Football League Lancashire Section, Northern Group Principal Competition Group A.

QR1 = First Qualifying Round
QR2 = Second Qualifying Round
QR3 = Third Qualifying Round
QR4 = Fourth Qualifying Round
QR5 = Fifth Qualifying Round
QR6 = Sixth Qualifying Round
R1 = Round 1
R2 = Round 2
R3 = Round 3
R4 = Round 4
R5 = Round 5
QF = Quarter-finals
SF = Semi-finals
RU = Runners-up
C = Champions

Seasons

Notes 

 A. : The League Cup competition started in the 1960–61 season.
 B. : Includes goals only scored in league games (including play-offs).
 C. : Founder members of the Lancashire League.
 D. : Equal points as 1st place team but lost on goal average.
 E. : Joined Lancashire Combination as founder members of new Division 2.
 F. : Following a disagreement with the Lancashire Combination, Southport joined forces with other disgruntled teams and formed The Central League.
 G. : Central League suspended due to outbreak of the First World War. Southport competed in the Football League Lancashire Section, Northern Group Principal Competition.
 H. : Leagues reorganised again. Southport competed in the Football League Lancashire Section, Northern Group Principal Competition Group A.
 I. : The Central League resumed after the war.
 J. : Southport were founder members of the Football League Third Division North.
 K. : Southport became the first Third Division North club to reach the quarter-finals in 1931, losing away at Everton 9–1.
 L. : A new Fourth Division was created in 1958 along with a new Third Division by merging the regionalised Third Division North and Third Division South.
 M. : Southport were subjected to a re-election vote by other league clubs after having finished in the bottom four and were duly voted out of the football league and into the Northern Premier League.

 N. : With the formation of the Alliance Premier League (officially called Football Conference from 1986), the Northern Premier League dropped down one level in the English football league system and became a feeder league to the Alliance.
 O. : The 1981–82 season saw the introduction of three points for a win.
 P. : Southport's first appearance in the final of a major knockout cup competition, which was a 1–0 defeat to Cheltenham Town. It is also the first time Southport have played at Wembley.
 Q. : The 2001–02 edition of the Football League Trophy saw 8 Football Conference sides (Top four Northern teams and four Southern) playing in the competition. As a result of Southport being the highest placed northern team by finishing 4th in the 2000–2001 season they qualified for the competition for the 2001–02 season.
 R. : The 2002–03 edition of the Football League Trophy saw 12 Football Conference teams playing in the competition. Despite Southport finishing the 2001–2002 season in 15th place they qualified due to most of the teams who finished above being geographically southern.
 S. : Formation of the Conference North and Conference South divisions for the 2004–05 season saw the top 13 teams from the Northern Premier League promoted to form the new divisions alongside teams from the Southern League and the Isthmian League.
 T. : Southport lost in the play-off semi-final to Stalybridge Celtic on penalties after finishing 2–2 on aggregate.
 U. : Farsley Celtic were removed out of the division with their results being expunged.
 V. : Rushden & Diamonds were expelled from the Conference National on 11 June 2011. This decision was made due to their unstable financial position, meaning they could not guarantee being able to complete all their fixtures in the 2011–12 season, Southport, as the highest placed relegated team were thus reprieved.

References
General

Specific

Seasons
Southport